Orpheus Music is an independent record label that is part of Hush Management and is dedicated to R&B and jazz music, and home of recording artist Freddie Jackson. For years, it was distributed by EMI.

Roster
Eric Gable
Freddie Jackson
Meli'sa Morgan
Vlad
Compton's Most Wanted
Melba Moore
Najee

See also
 List of record labels

American independent record labels
Contemporary R&B record labels
Jazz record labels